The second season of Top Gear began airing on History from July 24, 2011 until April 3, 2012. Adam Ferrera, Tanner Foust, Rutledge Wood and The Stig returned as hosts, with the season consisting of sixteen episodes, which aired on a weekly basis. This was the final season to include car reviews and the Power laps and Big Star, Small Car segment, as they were discarded from the programme before the third season.

Production
Commenting on the second season renewal, UK show host Jeremy Clarkson noted, "Top Gear is our baby so you can understand why Hammond, May and I were anxious about passing it on to the presenters of the US show. We needn’t have worried because Top Gear is clearly in safe hands, even if they do insist on speaking in those stupid accents. Watching an episode from series 1 with Richard and James, we found ourselves in a genuinely heated debate about which of the presenters’ cars was best. We were just three ordinary chaps watching a car show and loving it, which is exactly what Top Gear should be. Bring on series 2." The second season was also the first to include sixteen episodes, as the previous season aired ten.

Episodes

Broadcast
The season was aired from July 24, 2011 until April 3, 2012 on History, airing on a weekly basis. In the United Kingdom, the season was aired on BBC Three under the name Top Gear USA from January 13, 2012. However, the season halted airing on January 27, before continuing its run on June 29, 2012.

DVD release
The season 2 DVD was released on February 19, 2013.

References

External links
 Season 2 at the Internet Movie Database

Top Gear seasons
2011 American television seasons
2012 American television seasons
2011 in American television
2012 in American television